2013 Universiade may refer to:

2013 Summer Universiade, a summer sporting event held in Kazan
2013 Winter Universiade, a winter sporting event held in Trentino